The title King of Lombardy could refer to:
The Lombard kings
The rulers of the medieval Kingdom of Italy
The rulers of the Kingdom of Lombardy–Venetia